Stumptown Coffee Roasters is a coffee roaster and retailer based in Portland, Oregon, United States. The chain's flagship café and roastery opened in 1999. Three other cafes, a roastery and a tasting annex have since opened in Portland, as well as locations in Seattle, New York, Los Angeles, Chicago, and New Orleans. Stumptown is owned by Peet's Coffee, which in turn is owned by JAB Holding Company. The company was an early innovator with cold brew coffee in nitro cans and have continued to develop other cold brew product innovations.

Business model

Founder Duane Sorenson and Stumptown Coffee Roasters have been labeled as part of the third wave of coffee movement.

Sorenson and his employees visited coffee farms in person and reportedly paid high prices for beans, occasionally three or four times the fair trade price. He once set the record for highest price ever paid for coffee beans.

Sorenson also offered atypical perks to his employees such as paying for a compilation album to be produced of their various bands, and hiring a full-time on-staff massage therapist. Stumptown has received numerous awards, including Roaster of the Year 2006.

In 2015, Stumptown Coffee Roasters was bought by Peet's Coffee for an undisclosed amount.

Locations

Stumptown operates five cafes in Portland. They're located on SE 45th & Division St., SE 34th & Belmont, downtown at SW 3rd & Ash St., inside the Ace Hotel at 1022 SW Stark Street, and at the Portland International Airport. The company also owns a roasting facility and a retail annex inside their headquarters at 100 SE Salmon St. The original location on SE Division was previously a hair salon called "The Hair Bender," whose name Stumptown adopted for one of their signature espresso blends.

In November 2007, Stumptown opened two cafes in Seattle. In September 2009, the company also launched a cafe in New York's Ace Hotel. A temporary "pop-up" location appeared in Amsterdam's De Pijp neighborhood in May 2010. Opened by Sorenson, he claimed it was never intended to be permanent and closed its doors that same year.

In 2013, Stumptown opened a second New York City café and a café/roaster in Los Angeles. In January 2014, the company began selling coffee, pre-mixed with milk, in grocery stores. Additional cafes have also opened in Chicago and New Orleans. Stumptown opened their third New York cafe in a historic Brooklyn firehouse in the summer of 2018.

See also 

 List of coffeehouse chains
 List of coffee companies

Notes

References

Foley, Karen. This Olde Coffee House. Willamette Week. Retrieved February 16, 2006.
Moss, Matthew. (April 17, 2002). Cafe Ole Ole Ole. Willamette Week. Retrieved February 16, 2006.

Sloan, Gene. (March 7, 2002). 10 Great Places for Caffeine and Conversation. USA Today. Retrieved February 16, 2006.

External links

1999 establishments in Oregon
Coffee brands
Coffeehouses and cafés in the United States
Coffee in Portland, Oregon
Food and drink companies based in Portland, Oregon
American companies established in 1999
Restaurants established in 1999
2015 mergers and acquisitions
Certified B Corporations in the Food & Beverage Industry